East Camden may refer to:
East Camden, Arkansas, a city in Arkansas
East Camden, New Jersey, a neighborhood
East Camden, South Carolina, an unincorporated community and census-designated place in South Carolina